The Selfridge Military Air Museum is an aviation museum located at Selfridge Air National Guard Base near Mount Clemens, Michigan.

History 
The museum was founded in 1975 by Colonel Robert A. Stone. The museum was moved slightly in 2000 to accommodate a new fence. The same year train trips to the museum by the Michigan Transit Museum were offered.

The museum announced plans to build a new education center in October 2021. A few months later, it began planning to build a new perimeter road for the base and public access to the museum.

Exhibits 
Displays at the museum include a Link Trainer, T56-A-7 turboprop engine, and two aircraft cockpits.

Collection 

 Beechcraft C-45B Expeditor
 Beechcraft SNB-5 Navigator
 Bell AH-1F Cobra
 Bell UH-1H Iroquois
 Cessna O-2A Skymaster
 Cessna U-3A
 Convair C-131D Samaritan
 Convair TF-102A Delta Dagger
 Convair F-106A Delta Dart
 Douglas A-4B Skyhawk
 Douglas A-26C Invader
 Fairchild Republic A-10A Thunderbolt II
 General Dynamics F-16A Fighting Falcon
 Goodyear FG-1D Corsair
 Grumman F-14A Tomcat
 Grumman US-2A Tracker
 Lockheed C-130A Hercules
 Lockheed C-130E Hercules
 Lockheed P-3B Orion
 Lockheed T-33A
 LTV A-7D Corsair II
 Martin RB-57A Canberra
 McDonnell F-4C Phantom II
 McDonnell RF-101C Voodoo
 North American F-86A Sabre
 North American F-100D Super Sabre
 North American F-100F Super Sabre
 North American T-6 Texan
 Northrop F-89C Scorpion
 Republic F-84F Thunderstreak
 Republic RF-84F Thunderflash
 Sikorsky HH-52 Seaguard
 SPAD XIII – replica

See also 
 Minnesota Air National Guard Museum
 Yankee Air Museum
 List of aviation museums

References

Notes

Bibliography

External links 
 

1975 establishments in Michigan
Aerospace museums in Michigan
Military and war museums in Michigan
Museums in Macomb County, Michigan
Museums established in 1975